Ismail Atalan (born 1 April 1980) is a German-Turkish football manager, who last managed Hallescher FC.

Coaching career
Ismail Atalan started his managerial career in 2008 as a player-manager for the reserve team of the 1. FC Gievenbeck. In 2012, he became manager of Davaria Davensberg, where he coached until 2014. In November 2014, Atalan became head coach of Sportfreunde Lotte. In 2016, he led them to promotion to the 3. Liga. He became the new manager of VfL Bochum on 11 July 2017. He returned to Lotte on 9 April 2019. He moved to Hallescher FC on 25 February 2020. He was sacked on 8 June 2020.

Honours

Manager
Individual
 3. Liga Manager of the Season: 2016–17

References

1980 births
Living people
German football managers
Turkish football managers
German people of Turkish descent
3. Liga managers
2. Bundesliga managers
VfL Bochum managers
Sportfreunde Lotte managers
Hallescher FC managers